The Archdiocese of Bratislava is a Roman Catholic archdiocese in western Slovakia including Bratislava and the western Trnava regions. It has its seat in Bratislava. The current archbishop is Stanislav Zvolenský and auxiliary bishop is Jozef Haľko.

History
It was first created as Apostolic Administration of Trnava on 29 May 1922, subordinate to the Archdiocese of Esztergom. On the order of Pope Paul VI on 30 December 1977, it was separated from the former, elevated to the status of diocese and renamed to the Archdiocese of Trnava, and it had at first suffragans of Nitra, Banská Bystrica, Rožňava, Košice and Spiš. On 31 March 1995, the archdiocese was renamed to Archdiocese of Bratislava-Trnava, and since then it had only suffragans of Banská Bystrica and Nitra. Its territory covered Bratislava, Trnava, Nitra (except the city of Nitra and the strip connecting it with the main part of the Diocese of Nitra), small part of the Trenčín and south-western part of the Banská Bystrica regions. As of 2004, it covered an area of approximately 14,000 km2 with a population of 1,930,000 people of which around 70% were of Catholic faith.

On 14 February 2008, the archdiocese was split between several dioceses. It was renamed from Bratislava-Trnava into Archdiocese of Bratislava and the seat moved from Trnava to Bratislava, which became the seat of the Slovak church. Trnava became seat of the newly created Archdiocese of Trnava, which however still belongs to the ecclesiastical province of Bratislava as its suffragan.  Other parts of the former diocese have been split between the dioceses of Nitra and Banská Bystrica.

References

External links
 Archdiocese of Bratislava-Trnava 

1922 establishments in Slovakia
Bratislava, Roman Catholic Archdiocese o
Bratislava
Bratislava
Organisations based in Bratislava
Religion in Bratislava